Prolobitidae is a family of middle and upper Devonian ammonoid cephalopods currently included in the goniatitid suborder Tornoceratina and superfamily Dimeroceratoidea, but previously included in the ancestral Anarcestida.

Prolobitids are characterized by goniatic sutures with an undivided ventral lobe and primary lateral lobes that are introduced in the umbilical region.  They have shells which are discoidal to subglobular, some bearing transverse ribs and the umbilicus is generally moderate to closed.

Prolobitidae is divided into two subfamilies, Prolobitinae consisting of subglobular to subdiscoidal shells with moderate to closed umbilici, and Raymondoceratinae consisting of discodal shells with transverse ribs and large umbilici.

The Prolobitidae have been considered the likely ancestors for Prolecanitida.

References
 Miller, Furnish, and Schindewolf,1957; Paleozoic Ammonoidea, Suborder Anarcestina, L29-L33, in The Treatise on Invertebrate Paleontology, Part L, Ammonoidea.
 The Paleobiology Database as of 10/01/07

 
Goniatitida families
Dimeroceratoidea
Middle Devonian first appearances
Late Devonian animals
Late Devonian extinctions